The Kaya identity is a mathematical identity stating that the total emission level of the greenhouse gas carbon dioxide can be expressed as the product of four factors: human population, GDP per capita, energy intensity (per unit of GDP), and carbon intensity (emissions per unit of energy consumed). It is a concrete form of the more general I = PAT equation relating factors that determine the level of human impact on climate. Although the terms in the Kaya identity would in theory cancel out, it is useful in practice to calculate emissions in terms of more readily available data, namely population, GDP per capita, energy per unit GDP, and emissions per unit energy. It furthermore highlights the elements of the global economy on which one could act to reduce emissions, notably the energy intensity per unit GDP and the emissions per unit energy.

Overview 
The Kaya identity was developed by Japanese energy economist Yoichi Kaya. It is the subject of his book Environment, Energy, and Economy: strategies for sustainability co-authored with Keiichi Yokobori as the output of the Conference on Global Environment, Energy, and Economic Development (1993 : Tokyo, Japan). It is a mathematically more consistent variation of Paul R. Ehrlich & John Holdren's I=PAT formula that describes the factors of environmental impact.Kaya identity is expressed in the form:

Where:
 F  is global CO2 emissions from human sources
 P  is global population
 G  is world GDP
 E  is global energy consumption

And:
 G/P  is the GDP per capita
 E/G  is the energy intensity of the GDP
 F/E  is the emission intensity of energy

 Use in IPCC reports 
The Kaya identity plays a core role in the development of future emissions scenarios in the IPCC Special Report on Emissions Scenarios. The scenarios set out a range of assumed conditions for future development of each of the four inputs. Population growth projections are available independently from demographic research; GDP per capita trends are available from economic statistics and econometrics; similarly for energy intensity and emission levels. The projected carbon emissions can drive carbon cycle and climate models to predict future CO2 concentration and global warming.

 Other uses 
 Bill Gates used a form of the Identity, without attribution, at a TED Talk called Innovating to zero!. Writing in ThinkProgress'', Joseph J. Romm disputed the validity of Gates' arguments, as well as clarifying the key idea behind the identity.

See also
Eco-economic decoupling
Eco-efficiency
Eco-sufficiency
Global carbon reward
Industrial ecology
I=PAT
Life cycle analysis

References

External links 
 
 
 
 
 

Systems thinking
Environmental economics
Prediction
Climate change